Tumor necrosis factor receptor superfamily, member 19, also known as TNFRSF19 and TROY is a human gene.

The protein encoded by this gene is a member of the TNF-receptor superfamily. This receptor is highly expressed during embryonic development. It has been shown to interact with TNF receptor associated factor (TRAF) family members, and to activate c-Jun N-terminal kinases (JNK) signaling pathway when overexpressed in cells. This receptor is capable of inducing apoptosis by a caspase-independent mechanism, and it is thought to play an essential role in embryonic development. Alternatively spliced transcript variants encoding distinct isoforms have been described.

See also
 Mitogen-activated protein kinase for JNK signaling pathway description

References

Further reading

TNF receptor family